James Jefferson may refer to:
James Jefferson (gridiron football), American and Canadian football player
James Jefferson, of The MOD Squad

See also
James Jefferson Webster, American politician, businessman, and farmer